The FAI Cup 1926-27 was the sixth edition of Ireland's premier cup competition, The Football Association of Ireland Challenge Cup or FAI Cup. The tournament began on 8 January 1927 and concluded on 9 April with the final replay held at Shelbourne Park, Dublin. An official attendance of 10,000 people watched Leinster Senior League side Drumcondra defeat Brideville in the first final to be decided in extra time. Drumcondra completed a cup double having already won the FAI Intermediate Cup

First round

Second round

Semi-finals

Final

Replay

Notes
A.  From 1923-1936, the FAI Cup was known as the Free State Cup.

B.  Attendances were calculated using gate receipts which limited their accuracy as a large proportion of people, particularly children, attended football matches in Ireland throughout the 20th century for free by a number of means.

References
General

External links
FAI Website

1926-27
1926–27 in Irish association football
FAI Cup